|}

The Alleged Stakes is a Group 3 flat horse race in Ireland open to thoroughbreds aged four years or older. It is run over a distance of 1 mile and 2 furlongs (2,012 metres) at the Curragh in April.

The race was first run in 2003.  The race is named in honour of Alleged who was trained by Vincent O'Brien to win the Prix de l'Arc de Triomphe in 1977 and 1978. The 2017 running commemorated the centenary of O'Brien's birth. It was upgraded from Listed status to Group 3 in 2017.

Records

Most successful horse (2 wins):
 Parish Hall  – 2013, 2015

Leading jockey (3 wins):
Ryan Moore – Capri (2018), Magical (2019), Broome (2021)

Leading trainer (6 wins):
 Aidan O'Brien – Black Sam Bellamy (2003), Brian Boru (2004), Dylan Thomas (2007), Capri (2018), Magical (2019), Broome (2021)

Winners

See also
 Horse racing in Ireland
 List of Irish flat horse races

References

Racing Post:

 ifhaonline.org – International Federation of Horseracing Authorities – Alleged Stakes (2019).

Open middle distance horse races
Curragh Racecourse
Flat races in Ireland
Recurring sporting events established in 2003
2003 establishments in Ireland